The 1954–55 Panhellenic Championship was the 19th season of the highest football league of Greece.  Olympiacos won their 11th championship (2 consecutive) unbeaten having 19 wins out of 20 total games and only one draw against Panathinaikos.

The 6 clubs that participated in the final stage were as follows:
Athenian Championship: The first 2 teams of the ranking.
Piraeus' Championship: The champion.
Macedonian Championship: The champion.
Regional Championships: The 2 winners (Northern and Southern group).

The qualifying round matches took place from 10 October 1954 to 13 February 1955, while the final phase took place from 20 February to 17 July 1955. The point system was: Win: 3 points - Draw: 2 points - Loss: 1 point.

Qualification round

Athens Football Clubs Association

Piraeus Football Clubs Association

Macedonia Football Clubs Association

Regional Championship

Southern Group

Northern Group

The Thrace champion did not participate due to delay in the completion of the championship.

Final round

League table

Top scorers

References

External links
Rsssf, 1954-55 championship

Panhellenic Championship seasons
1954–55 in Greek football
Greek